Comerç 24 was a Michelin-starred restaurant in Barcelona, Spain. It closed in 2015.

References

Michelin Guide starred restaurants in Spain
Restaurants in Barcelona